Arhopala ganesa, the tailless bushblue, is  a species of lycaenid or blue butterfly found at the junction of the Palearctic realm and the Indomalayan realm.

Subspecies
A. g. ganesa Northwest India, Sikkim 
A. g. watsoni Evans, 1912 Assam, Central Burma
A. g. seminigra (Leech, 1890) West China, Hainan
A. g. loomisi (Pryer, 1886) Japan

References

Arhopala
Fauna of Pakistan
Butterflies of Indochina
Taxa named by Frederic Moore
Butterflies described in 1857